"Hell" is a single by American heavy metal band Disturbed from their compilation album, The Lost Children. The song was originally released as a B-side on the single "Stricken" (2005). As a single in its own right, the song hit radio stations on October 11, 2011. Disturbed's frontman David Draiman stated on his Twitter page that there is no video shoot for the single. An audio-only recording is available on YouTube.

According to David Draiman, "Hell" is "about a relationship with someone who keeps coming in and out of your life, and every time they come back they fuck up your whole world."

Track listing

Notes 
 Glass Shatters was played in 1999 at a live concert
 Pain was played in 1999 at a live concert

Charts

References

Disturbed (band) songs
2005 songs
2011 singles
Warner Records singles
Songs written by Dan Donegan
Songs written by David Draiman
Songs written by Mike Wengren
Song recordings produced by Johnny K